Kamal Rana (born 1928) was a Nepalese politician. She was appointed to the Senate in 1959, becoming its first female member. She and Dwarika Devi Thakurani, who had been elected to the House of Representatives were the first women in the Nepalese parliament.

Biography
Rana was born in Tansen in 1928, the daughter of Raja Tarak Bahadur Shah and Dibyashori Shah. Related to the royal family, she married Meen Shumsher J.B. Rana, an army general and earned a master's degree in political science. She established the Women's Volunteer Services in 1952, and in the same year was appointed vice-chair of the National Assembly. She later served in the Advisory Assembly from 1958 to 1959.

Following the introduction of the 1959 constitution, a bicameral parliament was created with an elected House of Representatives and an appointed Senate. In the 1959 elections one woman – Dwarika Devi Thakurani – was elected, while Rana was the sole woman appointed to the new Senate by King Mahendra. In July 1959 she was elected chair of the Senate. In 1962 she was a delegate to the United Nations General Assembly and between 1963 and 1965 sat on the United Nations Commission on the Status of Women. She also served in the Rastriya Panchayat.

Following the 1980 referendum on the system of government, she was appointed to the eleven-member Constitution Reform Recommendation Commission by King Birendra.

References

Members of the National Assembly (Nepal)
20th-century Nepalese women politicians
20th-century Nepalese politicians
Possibly living people
1928 births
Members of the Rastriya Panchayat
People from Tansen, Nepal